Kazem Ali Quereshi ( – 21 July 1951), known by his pen-name Kaykobad, was a Bengali poet. Nikhil Bharat Sahitya Sangha titled him "Kavyabhusan", "Vidyabhusan" and "Sahityaratna".

Early life and education
Kaykobad was born in Agla village of Nawabganj Upazila, Dhaka. His father Shahamatullah Al Qureshi was a lawyer at the Dhaka District Judge Court. Kaykobad attended Pogose School and St Gregory's School. He then went to Dhaka Madrasah and left the madrasah before the Entrance Examination without attending the examination.

Career
Kaykobad's poem "Birahabilap" was published in 1870, when he was about 13. He is most notable for the long narrative poem Mahashmashan. The poem narrates the story of the Third Battle of Panipat of 1761 and the defeat of the Marathas to Ahmed Shah Abdali. The poem was inspired by poet Nabinchandra Sen’s "Palashir Juddha". His other notable works are "Kusumkanan", "Asrumala", "Shibmandir", "Maharram Sharif", "Gitikavya" and "Azan"

Death
Kaykobad died of bronchopneumonia at Dhaka Medical College Hospital on 21 July 1951.

References

External links
   

1857 births
1951 deaths
Bengali male poets
Burials at Azimpur Graveyard
St. Gregory's High School and College alumni
Pogose School alumni
People from Dhaka
People from Dhaka District